Lasiodiplodia citricola is an endophytic fungus. It was first isolated in northern Iran, and is named after its first known host, citrus plants. It has since been isolated in other plants in other continents, and is considered a plant pathogen. L. citricola is phylogenetically related to L. parva, but conidia of the former are longer and wider.

Description
Its paraphyses are hyaline, cylindrical and thin-walled. Conidiophores are absent in this species. Conidiogenous cells are holoblastic and also hyaline. Conidia are aseptate, ellipsoid to ovoid and with longitudinal striations.

References

Further reading
 Chen, S. F., et al. "First report of Lasiodiplodia citricola and Neoscytalidium dimidiatum causing death of graft union of English walnut in California." Fungal Diversity 67 (2014): 157–179.
 Chen, S. F., et al. "First report of Lasiodiplodia citricola associated with stem canker of peach in California, USA." Journal of Plant Pathology 95.3 (2013).
 Van der Linde, Johannes Alwyn, et al. "Lasiodiplodia species associated with dying Euphorbia ingens in South Africa." Southern Forests: a Journal of Forest Science 73.3-4 (2011): 165–173.
 Marques, Marília W., et al. "Species of Lasiodiplodia associated with mango in Brazil." Fungal Diversity 61.1 (2013): 181–193.

External links
 MycoBank
 
 

Botryosphaeriaceae
Fungal citrus diseases
Fungi described in 2010